The 1952/1953 News of the World Snooker Tournament was a professional snooker tournament sponsored by the News of the World. The tournament was won by Joe Davis who won all of 8 matches. He finished ahead of Jackie Rea who won 5 matches. The News of the World Snooker Tournament ran from 1949/50 to 1959.

Format
The 1952/53 event was a round-robin snooker tournament and was played from 8 September 1952 to 17 January 1953. All matches were played at Leicester Square Hall in London. There were 9 competitors and a total of 36 matches. The competitors were Joe Davis, Fred Davis, Walter Donaldson, John Barrie, Albert Brown, Alec Brown, John Pulman, Jackie Rea and Sidney Smith. Jackie Read had won the qualifying event. Each match lasted three days and was the best of 37 frames.

Each match was separately handicapped. Joe Davis played level with Fred Davis and gave Walter Donaldson 10, Albert Brown and John Pulman 14, Sidney Smith 17, John Barrie and Alec Brown 18 and Jackie Rea 21. Fred Davis gave Walter Donaldson, Albert Brown and Sidney Smith 7, Alec Brown 12, John Pulman 14, John Barrie 18 and Jackie Rea 21. Walter Donaldson played level with Sidney Smith and gave Albert Brown 7, Alec Brown and John Pulman 10, John Barrie 12 and Jackie Rea 18. Sidney Smith played level with Albert Brown and John Pulman and gave Alec Brown 10, John Barrie 14 and Jackie Rea 18. Albert Brown gave John Pulman 5, Alec Brown 7, John Barrie 10 and Jackie Rea 16. John Pulman gave John Barrie and Alec Brown 7 and Jackie Rea 14. John Barrie played level with Alec Brown 7 and gave Jackie Rea 12. Alec Brown gave Jackie Rea 14.

Results
Despite giving between 10 and 21 points each frame, Joe Davis won his first seven matches comfortably. Playing level with brother Fred in the last match Joe won 26–11 to finished undefeated. Jackie Rea, who received between 12 and 21 points in all his matches, finished second.

Joe Davis made a break of 122 on 5 December, in his match against John Pulman.

Table

The positions were determined firstly by the number of matches won (MW) and, in the event of a tie, the number of frames won (FW). Albert Brown conceded his two matches scheduled for the week of 13 to 18 October. He played the first day of his match against Jackie Rea, trailing 10–2 but was then ill. Rea played a two-day exhibition match against John Pulman, while Fred Davis played a three-day exhibition match against Rex Williams, In the final table the matches were scored as 19–18 wins.

Qualifying
The qualifying tournament was played from 5 May to 7 June 1952. These matches were also played at Leicester Square Hall in London. As in the main event, each match lasted three days and was the best of 37 frames. There were 5 competitors: Kingsley Kennerley, Jim Lees, Jackie Rea, Willie Smith and Rex Williams. The qualifying was won by Jackie Rea who advanced to the main event.

Broadcasting
On 6 December the BBC showed two short, 30 minute, TV programmes of the final day of the match between Joe Davis and John Pulman. The commentators were Raymond Glendenning and  Sidney Smith.

References

News of the World Snooker Tournament
News of the World Tournament
News of the World Tournament
News of the World Tournament
News of the World Tournament
News of the World Tournament
News of the World Tournament